Magnesia Prefecture was one of the prefectures of Greece. Its capital was Volos. It was established in 1899 from the Larissa Prefecture. The prefecture was disbanded on 1 January 2011 by the Kallikratis programme, and split into the regional units of Magnesia and the Sporades.

The toponym is ancient to the region. Ore that attracts iron is common in Magnesia, which is the origin of words such as magnet and magnetism as well as the chemical element magnesium.

Sources 

Prefectures of Greece
Magnesia (regional unit)
Sporades
Geography of Thessaly
1899 establishments in Greece
Magnesia Prefecture
2010 disestablishments in Greece
States and territories disestablished in 2010